Peter Lewis Rost (born Otto Ludwig Peter Rosenstiel, Berlin, 19 September 1930 - 8 September 2022) was a retired British Conservative politician who served as a Member of Parliament (MP) from 1970 to 1992, and was a member of the Energy Select Committee. He was one of the founders of the Anglo German Parliamentary Group, which promoted good relations with the German Parliament. He instigated the annual conferences with German Parliamentarians, the first conference being held at his Hertfordshire home.

Early life
Rost's parents, Friedrich Rosenstiel and Elisabeth Merz, were a mixed marriage German Jew and Lutheran living in Berlin during the Nazi era. Their marriage was annulled and they escaped to the United Kingdom in 1937 before the international border was closed to Jews. Fred Rosenstiel was the economics editor of the Frankfurter Zeitung in Berlin. He later left for New York City, but the family was unable to follow him.

Rost was educated at various schools finishing in the VIth form at Aylesbury Grammar School and at Birmingham University, where he read geography.

Career 
Before entering Parliament, Rost was a stockbroker, lecturer and financial journalist. He unsuccessfully contested the safe Labour constituency of  Sunderland North at the 1966 general election, and at the 1970 general election he was elected as MP for the previously Labour-held seat of South East Derbyshire. He held that seat until the constituency was abolished for the 1983 general election, when he was returned to the House of Commons for the new Erewash.

Rost's main interest in Parliament was in energy.  He was the longest-serving Member of the Energy Select Committee, where he was ahead of his time in his promotion of renewable energy. He was an active member of the Combined Heat and Power Association (CHPA), of which he became Vice-President. He constantly bemoaned the loss of heat up the cooling towers of the UK power stations, and actively promoted district heating schemes. In the 1970s, he warned of the use of gas for power production, as it was wasting the precious North Sea assets. He retired from Parliament at the 1992 election.

Rost was a member of the Conservative Monday Club and the Bow Group; on the latter, he chaired the energy group. His autobiography, Weimar to Westminster, was published in November 2010.

Personal life and death 
In 1961, Rost married Hilary Mayo. He had two sons and two daughters.

Rost listed his recreations as tennis, ski-ing, gardening and antique map collecting. He lived in Berkhamsted, Hertfordshire, and also had a residence in Montauroux in the French Côte d'Azur. He died on 8 September 2022, aged 91.

In popular culture
Rost was portrayed by Julian Firth in the 2004 BBC production of The Alan Clark Diaries.

References

Times Guide to the House of Commons, 1987

External links

Living people
1930 births
English stockbrokers
Conservative Party (UK) MPs for English constituencies
Jewish emigrants from Nazi Germany to the United Kingdom
Members of the Parliament of the United Kingdom for constituencies in Derbyshire
UK MPs 1970–1974
UK MPs 1974
UK MPs 1974–1979
UK MPs 1979–1983
UK MPs 1983–1987
UK MPs 1987–1992
People educated at Aylesbury Grammar School
People from Berlin